"Prey" is a Batman comic book story arc written by Doug Moench, with art by Paul Gulacy and Terry Austin. It was originally published in five parts by DC Comics from September 1990 through February 1991 for Legends of the Dark Knight, issues #11 through #15, and later compiled as a trade paperback.

Plot
Prey is set during the early days of Batman's career as he is struggling to earn the trust of the public and form a working relationship with James Gordon, who is still just a police captain.

The main nemesis of the story is Hugo Strange, a brilliant psychiatrist who holds a professional stake and a personal obsession in unraveling Batman's secrets, including his true identity. He foments a smear campaign to paint Batman as a dangerous madman, which causes Batman to question his own sanity as well as the plausibility of his mission.

Synopsis
Part 1: Prey
 
Prey opens with Batman disrupting a police sting operation by shaking down a drug dealer for information on his supplier, a gangster named "The Fish", before the police could make their move on him.

The officer in charge of the sting, Sergeant Max Cort, tries to apprehend Batman but fails. Incensed, Cort reports to his superior, Captain James Gordon, and demands action against Batman for undermining his work and the morale of police officers. Gordon argues that Batman actually helps the police and helps morale by supporting them on the streets. Their argument is cut short as Gordon leaves for a late-night news show appearance.

On the news show, Gordon is interviewed alongside Gotham's current Mayor, Wilson Klass, and prominent psychologist, Dr. Hugo Strange, on the subject of Batman. Strange accurately theorizes that Batman must be motivated by a traumatic loss wrought by violent crime, but goes on to claim that Batman's costumed vigilantism is primarily an exercise in power and control for his own benefit, rather than anyone else's. Gordon rebukes Strange's analysis, explaining that the costume is simply to scare criminals and Batman is honestly trying to help Gotham. But Mayor Klass sides with Strange and takes a hard stance against Batman, announcing on-air that he's forming a police task force to apprehend Batman and assigning Gordon to head it. 

Impressed by his apparent expertise on Batman, Klass offers Strange a job as a police consultant, which he accepts. As a caveat, Strange demands full access to all police records, beginning with notable murder cases in Gotham,  so he can start profiling the caped crusader and unravel his true identity.

Reluctant to fulfill his new responsibilities to the task force, Gordon secretly withholds the complete police records from Strange. Gordon also recruits Cort to work under him, believing that the gung-ho sergeant is ill-equipped to keep up with the Dark Knight. However, Cort proves that Gordon underestimated his determination to rid Gotham of Batman by recruiting a band of like-minded officers to join him on the task force, without Gordon's permission. Cort and his men find Batman at The Fish's hideout, in the midst of apprehending the drug peddler. They immediately open fire on Batman, causing him to flee and letting The Fish escape.

Meanwhile, the depths of Doctor Strange's own unstable psychosis and obsession with Batman are revealed as he is shown alone in his penthouse, dressed up in a makeshift Batman costume, lamenting to a female mannequin about the simultaneous envy and hatred he feels towards Batman for the power and freedom he wields.  

Part 2: Dark Sides 

Batman returns to Wayne Manor, demoralized by last night's outing. Alfred informs him that Mayor Klass has invited Bruce Wayne to a dinner party and Dr. Strange is also expected to attend. At the party, the Mayor's daughter, Catherine, expresses admiration for Batman and ends up arguing with Strange, who asks her on a date, but is turned down.

At the police station, Cort and his comrades examine equipment Batman left behind the previous night and arrange to have their findings sent to Strange, but Gordon keeps their report stashed in his office. Nonetheless, Strange begins to make regular press announcements about the menace posed by Batman and turns Gotham against him. The media also reports the appearance of a new prowler in Gotham: a costumed burglar dubbed the Catwoman, who they claim is Batman's criminal accomplice, to the annoyance of both Batman and Catwoman.

Batman and Gordon secretly meet to discuss their current predicament: Batman's work is being derailed by Cort's interference and Strange's smear campaign, while Gordon's own career is in jeopardy unless he can deliver Batman to the authorities. Gordon tells Batman he'll try to stall Cort and Strange as long as he can, but suggests that Batman work to improve his public standing so the mayor will reconsider his stance. Batman agrees, and Gordon promises to contact him later.

Batman tracks The Fish to a new hideout and captures him. In broad daylight, Batman hands the criminal to Sgt. Cort as a peace offering and asks for a truce, but Cort interprets the gesture as another taunt against his competence and opens fire, attempting to arrest him again. Gordon later calls a meeting with Batman on the rooftop of police headquarters by placing a Bat-shaped stencil on the building's searchlight, unaware that Cort is spying on them from an adjacent building.

Furious, Cort breaks into Gordon's office and uncovers evidence of his collusion with Batman, including the data he was hiding from Strange. Cort takes the evidence directly to Strange who deduce that Batman must be a man of wealth, and asks Cort to help take down Batman and Gordon.

Part 3: Night Scourge!

The next evening, Catherine Klass reluctantly goes on a date with Strange as a courtesy to her father. When Catherine ends the date because of Strange's endless ranting about Batman, he snaps and threatens her. At home, Strange calls Cort over to discuss their plans and Cort agrees to let Strange hypnotize him, under the pretense of alleviating stress. In reality, Strange use hypnosis to make Cort believe that he can be like Batman, but "better". Strange gives Cort a makeshift costume, complete with a mask and a pair of samurai swords before sending him home.

Cort begins to drive home but suddenly feels a compulsion to put on the equipment and hunt for criminals. Cort ends up at a biker bar where a suspected arms dealer frequents. After viciously attacking the bikers inside, he tracks the arms dealer back to his home and nearly beat him to death before leaving him at the police station with a note: "The Night-Scourge Wants to Help Too".

The media picks up the story about "Night Scourge" and Dr. Strange publicly denounces Night Scourge's violent exploits as a result of Batman's existence. Cort himself is pleased with his work, believing that it proves he is just as 'good' as Batman, but admits he will need to face Batman to prove that he is better. Hunting for Batman as Night Scourge, Cort happens upon Catwoman, about to commit another burglary. Cort attacks her but Batman intervenes before he can kill her, and soundly defeats Cort. Disillusioned, Cort flees from Batman, who is forced to let him go after Catwoman blindsides him with a pipe, afraid he might attack her too.

Cort returns to Strange's penthouse where he is hypnotized further. Under Strange's orders, Cort breaks into Mayor Klass's home and assaults him and Catherine while dressed as Batman. Pretending to be Batman, Cort taunts the Mayor and kidnaps his daughter, threatening to kill her if he doesn't disband the task force. The next day, Mayor Klass institutes a 'shoot to kill' order against Batman and demands Catherine's safe return within five days or Gordon will be fired from the police force.

Part 4: The Nightmare

Batman spends the next evening being hunted by the police across Gotham. After a lengthy foot chase, Batman deduces that Strange must have a hand in framing him. Batman confronts Strange in his penthouse and demands to know the identity of the Night Scourge, and his role in Catherine Klass's kidnapping. Strange taunts Batman without revealing any information and hits him with a hallucinogenic gas that causes him to relive the night his parents were murdered. Completely disoriented, Batman falls off a balcony, but not before audibly crying out for his mother and father, which gives Strange the final clue he needs to piece together Batman's identity.

Batman narrowly survives the fall from the penthouse, but remains in the throes of the hallucinogen. Believing he is once again a little boy, and is being chased by his parents' killer, Batman runs from a police officer trying to arrest him, escapes by jumping into the sewers, and nearly drowns as he is washed out to sea. Batman wakes up the next morning under a pier, bruised and battered. When he walks back onto shore he is attacked by a mob of civilians. Batman manages to escape but is shocked by how much the public hates him and how little fear they showed.

When Batman returns to the manor he finds Alfred unconscious, the victim of assault. He is also greeted by what appears to be his mother and father sitting the dining room. The apparitions of his parents begin to taunt him for being a failure and blame their deaths on him. As he runs around the manor in fear, the voices and figures of his parents seem to chase him from room to room. Alfred, who has regained consciousness, tries to calm Bruce, explaining that the figures that he thinks are his parents are just elaborate mannequins with tape recorders placed inside them, but Bruce, still suffering from the residual effects of the hallucinogen, strikes him and flees to the safety of the Batcave where he collapses in exhaustion.

Part 5: The Kill

After cloistering himself within the Batcave for three days, Bruce regains his bearings but remains shaken by the visions he experienced. He considers whether the path of Batman is one that his parents would have approved of or if it is simply the course of an insane man as Strange suggested. After reflecting, Bruce rationalizes that being Batman represents an act of sanity and order that defies the madness and chaos represented by crime and injustice. Remembering that today is the final day of the deadline against Gordon, Batman calls him and they prepare for a final confrontation with Strange and Night Scourge, who has embarked on a murderous vigilante spree.

Leaving in his newly assembled Batmobile, Batman goes to Strange's penthouse and finds him once again dressed in a Batman costume and conversing with a mannequin. Batman appeals to Strange's ego and lets him gloat about staging the frame-up. But when Strange turns the subject towards Batman's true identity, Batman simply plays ignorant to Strange's ravings, saying he has no idea what Strange is talking about, and points out the Doctor's erratic and bizarre behavior as evidence that it is he who is mad and his profiling work is based on delusion.

Gordon and a uniformed police officer then burst through Strange's door and Batman reveals that he has been recording their entire meeting, including Strange's confession to the kidnapping. The officer finds Catherine tied up in another room, but otherwise unharmed. When Gordon attempts to arrest Strange, the doctor runs outside and finds himself in front of more cops. Mistaking him for Batman because of his costume, they act on Mayor Klass's shoot-to-kill orders, and open fire. Strange is hit numerous times before falling into a river. Presuming Strange to be dead, Batman goes in search of Night Scourge, who he now knows is Max Cort.

Batman finds Cort, now completely unhinged from sanity, and they have another duel. Thanks to some surprise help from Catwoman, Batman defeats Cort, who flees to police headquarters, still in his Night Scourge costume. When his fellow officers pull their guns on him, Cort unmasks himself and goes on a tirade against Batman and Gordon, who have followed him there. Cort draws a gun to shoot Gordon but is immediately killed by the other officers.

The story comes to a close with Gordon explaining to Mayor Klass how Strange and Cort were responsible for kidnapping his daughter and it was the Batman who saved her. Grateful, Klass disbands the anti-Batman task force so the police can concentrate on the "real criminals". Gordon meets with Batman one more time to inform him that Strange's body has still not been found. Gordon also adds that while the mayor and public have mostly forgiven Batman, there will always be people who resent and demonize him in some way because of what he does; either way, Gordon believes that Gotham needs Batman so he will continue to work with him.

Continuity
Prey is set during modern Batman's early days as a crime-fighter.

Prey also references Frank Miller and David Mazzucchelli's Batman: Year One. This includes Gordon's rank as Captain at the beginning of this story, Catwoman's blossoming criminal career, and Gordon citing his main reason for trusting Batman is that Batman saved his son's life at the end of Year One.

References

Comics by Doug Moench